Mellow Yellow is the fourth album from Scottish singer-songwriter Donovan. It was released in the US in February 1967 (Epic Records LN 24239 (monaural) / BN 26239 (rechanneled stereo), but not released in the UK because of a continuing contractual dispute that also prevented Sunshine Superman from a UK release. In June 1967, a cross-section of both albums was released as Sunshine Superman (Pye Records NPL 18181) in the UK. "Mellow Yellow" was the name of Donovan's hit single released the previous November.

History
The songs on Mellow Yellow represent a transition in Donovan's writing. Donovan's songs had previously illustrated his infatuation with an ability to define the mid-sixties pop music scene. On Mellow Yellow this is still evident in "Sunny South Kensington", "Museum" (originally recorded for the Sunshine Superman album and rerecorded for Mellow Yellow) and the title track, but is also tempered with world-weary observations of that scene ("Young Girl Blues"). The contractual problems that prevented the release of Donovan's music in the UK led him to write such songs as the resigned "Writer in the Sun", where he contemplates the possibility of his own forced retirement from the music industry at the age of 20.

Mickie Most's production and the arrangements of John Paul Jones accommodate these two divergent traits of Donovan's songwriting throughout Mellow Yellow. The peppier songs feature a diverse selection of instruments similar to Sunshine Superman and helped make a top 10 hit out of the title track on both sides of the Atlantic. The introspective ruminations feature sparse instrumentation that highlights Donovan's guitar playing, singing, and lyrics.

On Mellow Yellow, Donovan gave a nod to his friend Bert Jansch on "House of Jansch", marking the third Donovan album in a row that paid tribute to the British folk personage.

John Cameron played blues piano, harpsichord, and undertook arrangements.

Paul McCartney provided background vocals on at least one of the tracks. He is uncredited for his work.

Odell Brown and the Organizers covered Mellow Yellow in 1967 on their album by the same title.

Legacy
According to a recent biography ("Darker Than The Deepest Sea: The Search For Nick Drake"), the album was a significant influence on Nick Drake.

The track "Museum" was covered by Herman's Hermits on their 1967 album release Blaze.

Reissues
On 24 October 1994, EMI released Four Donovan Originals (EMI 7243 8 30867 2 6) in the UK. Four Donovan Originals is a compact disc box set containing four Donovan albums that were not previously released in the UK. Mellow Yellow is disc two of that set.
On 16 January 2001, Collectables Records released Mellow Yellow/Wear Your Love Like Heaven (Collectables 6644), which contained all of Mellow Yellow and the first record of A Gift from a Flower to a Garden, Wear Your Love Like Heaven.
On 24 May 2005, EMI reissued Mellow Yellow (EMI 8735672) with ten bonus tracks.
On 24 September 2010, Sony Music Entertainment reissued Mellow Yellow as part of a 3-CD set with The Hurdy Gurdy Man and Barabajagal
On 1 October 2018, The state51 Conspiracy reissued Mellow Yellow (CON224LP) in the UK and Ireland on LP.

Track listing
All tracks by Donovan Leitch. Songs marked with a ‘+’ have been remixed into stereo.

Original album
Side one
"Mellow Yellow" – 3:47
"Writer in the Sun" – 4:33 +
"Sand and Foam" – 3:19
"The Observation" – 2:23
"Bleak City Woman" – 2:24

Side two
"House of Jansch" – 2:43
"Young Girl Blues" – 3:45
"Museum" – 2:54
"Hampstead Incident" – 4:41 +
"Sunny South Kensington" – 3:48 +

2005 EMI CD version
The ten tracks as on the original release plus the following bonus tracks:
"Epistle to Dippy" – 3:11
"Preachin' Love" – 2:40
"Good Time" – 1:54
"There is a Mountain" – 2:36 +
"Superlungs" (second version) – 3:17
"Epistle to Dippy" (alternative arrangement) – 3:13 +
"Sidewalk (The Observation)" (demo) – 2:29
"Writer in the Sun" (demo) – 3:30
"Hampstead Incident" (demo) – 3:52
"Museum" (demo) – 3:49

Personnel
Musicians
 Donovan – acoustic guitar, vocals
 John Cameron – piano (tracks 4–5, 10, 12–13, 15), harpsichord (tracks 10, 11, 16), organ (track 10) celesta (tracks 2, 6), arrangements (tracks 2, 4–6, 9, 11–16)
 John Paul Jones – Bass guitar, arrangement (track 1)
 Danny Thompson, Spike Heatley – bass
 Phil Seamen – drums
 Bobby Orr – drums (tracks 1, 10)
 John McLaughlin – rhythm guitar (track 1)
 Joe Moretti – rhythm guitar (track 1)
 Danny Moss – saxophone (track 1)
 Ronnie Ross – saxophone (track 1)
 Big Jim Sullivan – electric guitar (track 5)
 Eric Ford – electric guitar (track 10)
 Shawn Phillips – sitar (track 10)
 Pat Halling – violin (track 8)
 Harold McNair – flute (tracks 2, 4, 18)

Additional musicians
 Paul McCartney – occasional bass
 Jimmy Page – electric guitar (tracks 11, 16)
 Tony Carr – percussion, drums (tracks 11, 16)

Technical
 Mickie Most – producer

Charts

Album

Singles

References

External links
Mellow Yellow – Donovan Unofficial Site
 

Donovan albums
1967 albums
Albums arranged by John Paul Jones (musician)
Albums produced by Mickie Most
Epic Records albums